Michael Fink is a footballer.

Michael Fink may also refer to:

Mike Fink (gridiron football) (born 1950), American gridiron football player
Michael L. Fink, American visual effects artist
Michael Fink, writer on apostasy
Mike Fink (1770–1823), brawler and riverboat man